Javier 'Javi' Jiménez Santafé (born 21 January 1979 in Santa Coloma de Gramanet, Barcelona, Catalonia) is a Spanish former footballer who played as an attacking midfielder.

He appeared in 178 Segunda División matches over seven seasons, totalling 13 goals for Villarreal CF, Elche CF, Recreativo de Huelva, Ciudad de Murcia and Albacete Balompié.

External links

1979 births
Living people
People from Santa Coloma de Gramenet
Sportspeople from the Province of Barcelona
Spanish footballers
Footballers from Catalonia
Association football midfielders
Segunda División players
Segunda División B players
Tercera División players
UDA Gramenet footballers
Villarreal CF players
Elche CF players
Recreativo de Huelva players
Ciudad de Murcia footballers
Albacete Balompié players
UE Lleida players
UE Sant Andreu footballers